The Siege of Golden Hill was a British children's television series set in a world of teenage gangs and council corruption on the outskirts of a major English city (based on Birmingham). It was produced by ATV Midlands.
Twelve episodes of 30 minutes each were broadcast on ITV between June and August 1975. The main parts were played by Gerry Sundquist, Billy Hamon and Sara Lee.
The scriptwriter was Nick McCarty and the producer John Sichel.

Episode titles
 Ultimatum
 Threats
 The Frighteners
 Besieged
 New Victims
 Extortion
 Undercover
 Intimidation
 Last Straw
 Nailed
 The Vandals Are Coming
 Bribery

External links
 

ITV children's television shows
1970s British children's television series
Television shows produced by Associated Television (ATV)
English-language television shows
1975 British television series debuts
1975 British television series endings
Television shows set in England
Gangs in fiction